Gary Prohm (born 3 October 1956) is a New Zealand former rugby league footballer and coach who represented New Zealand, including in matches that counted towards the 1988 World Cup.

Playing career
Prohm played in the Auckland Rugby League competition for Otahuhu and played for Auckland. In 1978 he made his début for the New Zealand national rugby league team. He played 23 Test Matches between 1978 and 1986.

Prohm moved to England in 1982, joining the Hull Kingston Rovers. He went on to play for four seasons for the club and claimed the club record for tries in as season by scoring 45 tries in 1984–85 season before leaving in 1986 to join Eastern Suburbs in Australia for two years.

Rugby League Championship

Prohm played in Hull Kingston Rovers Championship winning teams of the 1983–84 season and 1984–85 season

Challenge Cup Final appearances
Prohm played left-, i.e. number 4, and scored 2-tries in Hull Kingston Rovers' 14–15 defeat by Castleford in the 1984 Challenge Cup Final during the 1984–85 season at Wembley Stadium, London, on Saturday 3 May 1986, in front of a crowd of 82,134.

John Player Special Trophy Final appearances
Prohm played left-, i.e. number 4, and scored a try in Hull Kingston Rovers' 12-0 victory over Hull F.C. in the 1984–85 John Player Special Trophy Final during the 1984–85 season at Boothferry Park, Kingston upon Hull on Saturday 26 January 1985.

Premiership Trophy Final Appearances

Prohm played left-, i.e. number 4, and scored a try in Hull Kingston Rovers' 18-10 victory over Castleford Tigers in the Final of the 1983-84 Rugby League Premiership during the 1983–84 season

Prohm played left-, i.e. number 4, in Hull Kingston Rovers' 36-16 defeat against St.Helens in the Final of the 1984-85 Rugby League Premiership during the 1984-85 season

County Cup Final appearances

Prohm played left-, i.e. number 4, in Hull Kingston Rovers' 12–29 defeat by Hull F.C. in the 1984 Yorkshire County Cup Final during the 1984–85 season at Boothferry Park, Kingston upon Hull, on Saturday 27 October 1984.

Prohm played left-, in the 22–18 victory over Castleford in the 1985 Yorkshire County Cup Final during the 1985–86 season at Headingley Rugby Stadium, Leeds, on Sunday 27 October 1985.

1982 Kangaroo Tour

Prohm played  i.e. number 13, and scored a try in Hull Kingston Rovers' 30-10 defeat against the 1982 Kangaroos

1983 Queensland Tour

Prohm played left-, i.e. number 5, in Hull Kingston Rovers' 8-6 victory over Queensland   as they toured Papua New Guinea and England part of the 1983–84 Rugby Football League season

Later years
In 1994 Prohm coached the new Auckland City Vulcans in the Lion Red Cup competition.

He now runs Gary Prohm Automotive in Royal Oak.

References

1956 births
Living people
Auckland rugby league team coaches
Auckland rugby league team players
Automotive engineers
Hull Kingston Rovers players
Mount Albert Lions players
New Zealand national rugby league team players
New Zealand rugby league coaches
New Zealand rugby league players
Otahuhu Leopards players
Rugby league centres
Rugby league wingers
Sydney Roosters players